Neverita is a genus of medium-sized to large sea snails, marine gastropod molluscs in the subfamily Polinicinae  of the family Naticidae, the moon snails 

The type species of this genus is Neverita josephinia Risso, 1826.

Species
Species within the genus Neverita include:
 † Neverita amerrukensis Pacaud & Lebrun, 2019 
 Neverita aulacoglossa (Pilsbry & Vanatta, 1909)
 Neverita delessertiana (Recluz in Chenu, 1843) 
 Neverita didyma (Röding, 1798)
 Neverita duplicata (Say, 1822) 
 Neverita josephinia  Risso, 1826 Huelsken, T. et al. (2008) The Naticidae (Mollusca: Gastropoda) of Isola del Giglio (Tuscany, Italy): Shell characters, live animals, and a molecular analysis of egg masses. Zootaxa, 1770:1-40.
 Neverita lamonae Marincovich, 1975
 Neverita lewisii  (Gould, 1847)  
 † Neverita olla (de Serres, 1829)
 † Neverita pontis(Marwick, 1924) 

Species brought into synonymy 
 Neverita albumen (Linnaeus, 1758): synonym of Polinices albumen (Linnaeus, 1758)
 Neverita ampla (Philippi, 1849): synonym of Glossaulax didyma ampla (Philippi, 1849)
 Neverita hayashii Azuma, 1961: synonym of Glossaulax didyma hayashii (Azuma, 1961)
 Neverita hosoyai Kira, 1959: synonym of Glossaulax didyma hosoyai (Kira, 1959)
 Neverita nana (Møller, 1842): synonym of Pseudopolinices nanus (Møller, 1842)
 Neverita obtusa (Jeffreys, 1885): synonym of Euspira obtusa (Jeffreys, 1885)
 Neverita peselephanti ' (Link, 1807): synonym of Polinices peselephanti (Link, 1807)
 Neverita pilula Locard, 1897: synonym of Neverita obtusa (Jeffreys, 1885)
 Neverita politiana ' (Dall, 1919): synonym of Euspira pallida (Broderip & G.B. Sowerby I, 1829)
 Neverita reclusiana (Deshayes, 1839): synonym of Glossaulax reclusiana (Deshayes, 1839)
 Neverita reiniana Dunker, 1877: synonym of Glossaulax reiniana (Dunker, 1877) (original combination)
 Neverita robusta Dunker, 1860: synonym of Glossaulax didyma ampla (Philippi, 1849)
 Neverita secta Gabb, 1864: synonym of Glossaulax reclusiana (Deshayes, 1839)

References

Further reading
 Powell A. W. B. (1979), New Zealand Mollusca, William Collins Publishers Ltd, Auckland, New Zealand 
 Gofas, S.; Le Renard, J.; Bouchet, P. (2001). Mollusca, in: Costello, M.J. et al. (Ed.) (2001). European register of marine species: a check-list of the marine species in Europe and a bibliography of guides to their identification. Collection Patrimoines Naturels, 50: pp. 180–213

External links
 Risso A. (1826). Histoire naturelle des principales productions de l'Europe méridionale et particulièrement de celles des environs de Nice et des Alpes Maritimes, vol. 4. Paris: Levrault. vii + 439 pp., pls 1-12

Naticidae